The Port of Greifswald (German - Greifswalder Hafen) is an 1818-1820 painting by Caspar David Friedrich, showing a scene in the Bay of Greifswald. It is now in the Alte Nationalgalerie in Berlin, who acquired it in 1919.

See also
List of works by Caspar David Friedrich

References

External links

Paintings in the collection of the Alte Nationalgalerie
Paintings by Caspar David Friedrich
1820 paintings
Maritime paintings